Jacquelyn Harrison Barrett (born November 4, 1950) served three terms as sheriff of Fulton County, Georgia, making her the first African-American woman to ever receive the title in the United States. After a "reverse discrimination" lawsuit was filed against her by 18 deputy sheriffs, Barrett was suspended from office by Governor Sonny Perdue in 2004. She did not run for a fourth term.

Early life and education 
Jacquelyn H. Barrett was born November 4, 1950 in Charlotte, North Carolina, to parents Cornelius Harrison and Ocie Perry Harrison.

In 1972, Barrett graduated from college with a bachelor's degree in sociology, with a concentration in criminology. In 1973, Barrett received her master's degree in Criminology from Atlanta University.

Early career 
Before being elected sheriff of Fulton County, Barrett served a 10-year tenure as a curriculum specialist for the Georgia Peace Officer Standards and Training Council. She helped to develop programs that would be used to train police officers, and was eventually promoted to create these programs for the Chief of Police and sheriff. She then served two years as chief administrative officer for the Fulton County Sheriff's Office, and became the director of the Fulton County Public Safety Training Center in 1987.

Career as Sheriff 
In 1992, Barrett defeated both her Democratic Primary Election opponent Robert McMichaels, and her General Election opponent Morris Chappell (republican). As sheriff, Barrett managed the largest sheriff's department in Georgia, opened the South Fulton Precinct, recruited seventy-five volunteers to support various charitable organizations, and provided safety training to senior citizens.

During the Summer Olympics in Atlanta Barrett served as Sheriff and provided police support for the games.

In 2000, Barrett attended the Democratic National Convention, where she was interviewed by Lou Waters for CNN. She served on the Georgia Congressional Delegation and voiced her support for Al Gore. Barrett completed a second term as Sheriff, and continued to work through a third until she was suspended from office by Governor Sonny Perdue in August 2004. Barrett's final term as Fulton County's Sheriff ended on December 31, 2004.

Controversy 
In 2000, Barrett was called to court for several claims of racial discrimination brought forward by eighteen Fulton County Sheriff's Department employees. Of those eighteen claims, fourteen were found legitimate. Several of these officers were provided compensation for damages to their careers, and some were provided with forced promotions. The remaining four were not found to be discriminated against.

In 2006, a civil action suit was filed by an inmate alleging insufficient living conditions within the Fulton County Jail against Barrett and Fulton County. The Plaintiff stated to the court that he was not provided a properly ventilated cell, and that the food provided did not align with his prescribed diet. The court denied Barrett's request for summary judgement. Additionally, the Plaintiff's claim for prospective relief, and the Plaintiff's punitive-damages claims against Fulton County, and the Plaintiff's official-capacity claims against all former, current, or future sheriff of Fulton County were all denied.

In March 2004, rapper T.I. produced a music video inside of the Fulton County Jail while serving time. The music video was unauthorized by Sheriff Barrett, and the employees who allegedly allowed a small camera crew inside of the jail were terminated.

Life after law enforcement 
In 2008, Barrett began teaching criminology as an adjunct professor at the University of West Georgia and Spelman College in Atlanta. In 2012, it was reported that she also taught at the Fulton Leadership Academy, and focused on STEM programs for young boys. In March 2021, she received a Legacy Award from the Fulton County Sheriff's Office for her lifetime of contributions.

Personal life 
Jacquelyn H. Barrett became Jackie Barrett-Washington when she married Gene Washington. She has two children, Kimberly and Alan, and five grandchildren. Barrett has always been involved in the Christian faith, and has worked for and attended Cascade United Methodist Church.

Citations

Works Cited 

 

 

1950 births
Living people
African-American sheriffs
Women sheriffs
20th-century African-American people